William FitzAlan may refer to:

William FitzAlan, Lord of Oswestry (died 1160)
William FitzAlan, 1st Lord of Oswestry and Clun (died 1210), son of the above
William FitzAlan, 2nd Lord of Oswestry and Clun (died 1215)
William Fitzalan, 9th Earl of Arundel (1417–1487), descendant of the FitzAlans of Oswestry
William Fitzalan, 11th Earl of Arundel (1476–1544)